Lumbini Adarsha Degree College is a renowned leading educational institution located in kawasoti-5, Nawalparasi, Nepal. It was established in 2056 B.S.(1999 A.D.) official website.

Universities and colleges in Nepal
1999 establishments in Nepal